Mauri is a surname of Italian or Catalan origin   (the census of 1553 in Catalonia registers the name Maurí o Mauri in a dozen towns ). The name refers to:
Carlo Mauri (1930–1982), Italian mountaineer and explorer
Carolina Mauri (b. 1969), Costa Rican freestyle swimmer 
Cristian Roig Mauri (b. 1977), Andorran professional football player
Melcior Mauri (b. 1966), Catalan professional road bicycle racer
Roseta Mauri (1849–1923), Catalan dancer
Stefano Mauri (b. 1980), Italian professional football player

References